Riccardo Olavarrieta (born 12 April 1970) is a Mexican figure skater. He competed at the 1988 Winter Olympics and the 1992 Winter Olympics.

References

1970 births
Living people
Mexican male single skaters
Olympic figure skaters of Mexico
Figure skaters at the 1988 Winter Olympics
Figure skaters at the 1992 Winter Olympics
Place of birth missing (living people)